Suspended is a 1987 Polish film directed by Waldemar Krzystek. The film tells the story of a former Home Army (AK) member who hides for several years in the cellar of the house belonging to the woman he secretly married during the war. Making clear the link between this film and Andrzej Wajda's Man of Marble, the director chose two of Wajda's actors; Krystyna Janda and Jerzy Radziwiłowicz.

Cast 
 Krystyna Janda – Anna Mroczyńska
 Jerzy Radziwiłowicz – Marcel Wysocki
 Sława Kwaśniewska – Maria, mother of Anna
 Andrzej Łapicki – doctor Ruczyński
 Bogusław Linda – UB officer pursuing Marcel
 Bożena Dykiel – nurse, friend of Anna
 Klaudia Sznajder – Wicia, daughter of Anna and Marcel
 Igor Przegrodzki – Wincenty Wysocki, uncle of Marcel
 Danuta Balicka – Jadwiga, wife of Wincenty
 Ryszard Radwański – undercover agent, mole

References

1987 films